This is a list of notable Somalis from Somalia, Somaliland, Djibouti, Kenya, Ethiopia as well as the Somali diaspora.

Academics
 

Ali A. Abdi – sociologist and educationist, and professor of education and international development at the University of British Columbia in Vancouver, British Columbia, Canada; former President of the Comparative and International Education Society of Canada (CIESC); founding/co-founding editor of the peer reviewed online publications, Journal of Contemporary Issues in Education and Cultural and Pedagogical Inquiry
Mohamed Diriye Abdullahi – scholar, linguist and writer; published on Somali culture, history, language and ethnogenesis
Ali Jimale Ahmed – poet, essayist, scholar, and short story writer; published on Somali history and linguistics
Shire Jama Ahmed (c. 1935–1989) – linguist who devised a unique Latin script for the Somali language
Suleiman Ahmed Gulaid - prominent professor and the president of Amoud University
Abdirahman Hussein – scholar and teacher at University of Tennessee
Abdi Kusow – professor of sociology at Iowa State University in Ames, Iowa; has written extensively on Somali sociology and anthropology
Mohamed Haji Mukhtar – professor of African and Middle Eastern History at Savannah State University; has written extensively on the history of Somalia and the Somali language
Ismail Jim'ale Osoble – lawyer, once served as Minister of Information in the government of Aden Abdullah Osman Daar
Abdi Ismail Samatar – prominent scholar and professor at the University of Minnesota
Ahmed Ismail Samatar – prominent professor and Dean of the Institute for Global Citizenship at Macalester College; editor of Bildhaan: An International Journal of Somali Studies
Said Sheikh Samatar (1943–2015) – prominent scholar and writer and former professor of history at Rutgers University; main areas of interest are history and linguistics

Activists
 

Dekha Ibrahim Abdi (1964–2011) – peace activist in Kenya
Leila Abukar – political activist
Fartuun Adan – social activist; founder and executive director of the Elman Peace Centre
Elman Ali Ahmed – entrepreneur and social activist
Halima Ahmed – political activist with the Youth Rehabilitation Center in Mogadishu
Hodan Ahmed – political activist and Senior Program Officer at the National Democratic Institute
Ifrah Ahmed – social activist; founder of the UYI NGO
Nimco Ahmed – Somali-American political activist; State Director for the DFL
 Abdulkadir Yahya Ali (1957–2005) – peace activist, co-director and founder of the Center for Research and Dialogue. 
Abdirizak Bihi – social activist; Director of the Somali Education and Social Advocacy Center
Ilwad Elman – social activist at the Elman Peace Centre
Asha Haji Elmi (Caasha Xaaji Cilmi) (b. 1962) – peace activist in Somalia
Leyla Hussein – psychotherapist and social activist; Chief Executive of Hawa's Haven; co-founder of Daughters of Eve
Ahmed Hussen – Somali-Canadian lawyer and social activist; President of the Canadian Somali Congress
Farhiyo Farah Ibrahim – Somali social activist
Hanan Ibrahim – social activist based in the UK; founder of the Somali Family Support Group (SFSG)
Fatima Jibrell (b. 1947) – Somali-American environmental activist; co-founder and executive director of the Horn of Africa Relief and Development Organization ("Horn Relief"); co-founder of Sun Fire Cooking; was instrumental in the creation of the Women's Coalition for Peace
Hirsi Magan (Xirsi Magan Ciise) (1935–2008) – activist, scholar and one of the leading figures of the Somali Revolution
Magid Magid – Somali-British activist and politician who served as the Lord Mayor of Sheffield
Adam Matan – activist and community organiser who was the first Somali-Brit to be awarded the OBE medal by Prince William, Duke of Cambridge for services to the Somali community in the United Kingdom.
Hawa Aden Mohamed – social activist; chairperson of the Galkayo Education Centre for Peace and Development
Musse Olol – American social activist and Chairman of the Somali American Council of Oregon (SACOO)
Hibaaq Osman – political strategist; chairperson of the ThinkTank for Arab Women, the Dignity Fund, and El-Karama
Hawo Tako (d. 1948) – early 20th century female nationalist whose sacrifice became a symbol for pan-Somalism
Mohamud Siad Togane (b. 1943) – Somali Canadian poet, professor, and political activist
Hanad Zakaria Warsame (1952–2008) – doctor and anti-Communist activist
Shadya Yasin – Somali-Canadian social activist and member of the Ontario Premier's Council on Youth Opportunities

Artists
 
Aar Maanta – singer, composer, songwriter and music producer
Abdi Sinimo (c. 1920s–1967) – artist and inventor of the Balwo musical style
Abdullahi Qarshe (1924–1994) – musician, poet and playwright known for his innovative styles of music which included a wide variety of musical instruments such as the guitar, piano, and oud
Alisha Boe – actress, known for portraying Jessica in Netflix's original series 13 Reasons Why.  
Ali Feiruz (1931–1994) – musician; one of the first generation of Somali artists; prominent member of Hobolada Waaberi musical troupes
Amin Amir – Somali-Canadian cartoonist and painter
Barkhad Abdi – actor, best known for his portrayal of Abduwali Muse in the film, yCaptain Phillips, co-starring Tom Hanks.  
Elisa Kadigia Bove – Somali-Italian actress and activist
Guduuda 'Arwo – singer
Hassan Sheikh Mumin (1930/31–2008) – poet, reciter, playwright, broadcaster, actor and composer
Hasan Adan Samatar (b. 1953) – artist during the 1970s and 80s
Mohamed Mooge Liibaan (d. 1984) – artist from the Radio Hargeisa generation
Ahmed Mooge Liibaan (d. 1997) – artist from the Radio Hargeisa generation
Magool (1948–2004) (Halima Khaliif Omar) – considered in Somalia as one of the greatest entertainers of all time
Mohamed Sulayman Tubeec the King of Vocals
Mocky (Dominic Salole) (b. 1974) – Somali-Canadian pop music performer
Maryam Mursal (b. 1950) – musician, composer and vocalist whose work has been produced by the record label Real World
Marian Joan Elliott Said (Poly Styrene) (1957–2011) – pioneering Somali-British punk rock singer with X-Ray Spex
Jiim Sheikh Muumin – singer and instrumentalist
Jonis Bashir – Somali-Italian actor and singer
K'naan (b. 1978) – Somali-Canadian hip hop artist
Khadija Qalanjo – singer and folklore dancer in the 1970s and 1980s
Sulekha Ali – Somali-Canadian singer-songwriter
Saba Anglana – Somali-Italian actress and international singer
Waaberi – Somalia's foremost musical group; toured throughout several countries in Africa and Asia, including Egypt, Sudan and China
Waayaha Cusub – music collective led by Falis Abdi
Xiddigaha Geeska – Somali music band based in Hargeisa

Athletes
 

Liban Abdi (b. 1988) – international footballer; currently plays for Ferencvárosi TC in the Hungarian First Division, on loan from Sheffield United of England
Mohammed Ahamed (b. 1985) – Somali-Norwegian – Canadian Olympian in 2012, Nike-sponsored athlete
Abdi Mohamed Ahmed (b. 1962) – professional footballer 
Amin Askar (b. 1985) – Somali-Norwegian professional football player, playing for Fredrikstad FK in the Norwegian Premier League
Faisal Jeylani Aweys – taekwondo practitioner
Zahra Bani (b. 1979) – Somali-Italian javelin thrower
Abdi Bile (b. 1962) – world champion middle distance runner in the 1500 metres, and three time Olympian
Ayub Daud (b. 1990) – international footballer who plays as a forward/attacking midfielder for A.S. Gubbio 1910, on loan from Juventus
Rizak Dirshe (b. 1972) – Swedish middle distance runner
Mo Farah (b. 1983) – Somali-British gold medalist in international track and field; currently holds the British indoor record in the 3000 metre and won the 3000 m at the 2009 European Indoor Championships in Turin
 Youssouf Hersi
Abdisalam Ibrahim (b. 1991) – Somali-Norwegian footballer who plays for Manchester City;  Premier League's first Somali player and also the first East African
Fabio Liverani (b. 1976) – Somali-Italian international footballer
Mustafa Mohamed (b. 1979) – Somali-Swedish long-distance runner who mainly competes in the 3000 meter steeplechase; won gold in the 2006 Nordic Cross Country Championships and at the first SPAR European Team Championships in Leiria, Portugal in 2009; beat the 31-year-old Swedish record in 2007

Authors
 
Jama Musse Jama – ethnomathematician and writer
Ayaan Hirsi Ali (Ayaan Xirsi Cali or Ayaan Hirsi Magan) (b. 1969) – feminist and political writer
Gaariye (Mohamed Hashi Dhamac) (b. 1951) – poet and writer
Yasmine Allas – actress and writer
Farah Awl (1937–1991) – author; specialized in historical fiction
Cristina Ali Farah (b. 1973) – Somali-Italian writer and poet
Elmi Boodhari (d. 1940) – pioneer, writer and poet, known as (King of Romance) among Somalis
Nuruddin Farah (b. 1945) – considered one of the greatest contemporary writers in the world
Musa Haji Ismail Galal (b. 1917) – writer, scholar, historian and linguist; one of the foremost historical authorities on the Somali astrological, astronomical, meteorological and calendrical systems
Hadrawi (Mohamed Ibrahim Warsame) (b. 1943) – songwriter, philosopher, and Somali Poet Laureate; dubbed the "Somali Shakespeare"
Afdhere Jama (b. 1980) – Somali-American writer based in San Francisco
Abdukadir Osman – writer
Aadan Carab, poet who narrated the Dhulbahante genocide at the hands of European colonialists in the Darawiish era
Salaan Carrabey (d. 1943) – legendary poet
Hussein M. Adam – writer, journalist and professor 
Ladan Osman – poet and teacher
Sofia Samatar – Somali-American writer
Igiaba Scego – Somali-Italian writer
Warsan Shire (b. 1988) – poet
Abdillahi Suldaan Mohammed Timacade (1920–1973) – poet known for his nationalist poems such as "Kana siib Kana Saar"
Abdourahman Waberi (b. 1965) – writer and teacher
Nadifa Mohamed – Somali-British novelist and Fellow of the Royal Society of Literature

Directors
 
Abdisalam Aato – film director and producer; leader in Somaliwood cinematic movement
Fathia Absie – film director, broadcaster and writer
Said Salah Ahmed – playwright, poet, educator and filmmaker
Mo Ali – Somali-British film director
Ali Said Hassan – film director and producer; former Somali Film Agency representative
Idil Ibrahim – filmmaker; founder of Zeila Films
Barni Ahmed Qaasim – multimedia artist and filmmaker
Abdulkadir Ahmed Said (b. 1953) – film director, producer, screenwriter, cinematographer and editor

Entrepreneurs
 
Nasra Agil – Somali-Canadian civil engineer and entrepreneur
Omar A. Ali – entrepreneur, accountant, philanthropist, and specialist on Islamic finance; formerly CEO of DMI Trust, currently chairman of Integrated Property Investments Ltd and Quadron investments
Abdirashid Duale – entrepreneur, philanthropist, and the CEO of the multinational enterprise Dahabshiil
Liban Abdi Egal – founder and Chairman of First Somali Bank
Nuria Sheikh Farah – entrepreneur; owner of Risala Enterprises Ltd. and Chairperson of Gargaar
Faisal Hawar – engineer and entrepreneur; CEO, President, and co-founder of the International Somalia Development Foundation as well as the Maakhir Resource Company
Amina Moghe Hersi (b. 1963) – entrepreneur; has launched several multimillion-dollar projects in Kampala, Uganda, such as the Oasis Centre luxury mall and the Laburnam Courts; runs Kingstone Enterprises Limited, one of the largest distributors of cement and other hardware materials in Kampala
Ayaan and Idyl Mohallim – twin fashion designers and owners of the Mataano brand
Aden Mohammed – banker and entrepreneur; managing director of Barclays Bank in East and West Africa; under his tenure BBK won the Banker Awards 2009
Hussein Mohamed – entrepreneur; Vice Chairman of the Eastleigh Business Association
Hodan Nalayeh – media executive and entrepreneur; President of the Cultural Integration Agency and the Vice President of Sales & Programming Development of Cameraworks Productions International
Hussein Shire – businessman; founder and former CEO of Gateway Bus Company

Journalists
 
Mona Kosar Abdi – Somali-American multimedia journalist
Hassan Abdillahi – journalist and social activist; founder and Chairman of Ogaal Radio
Mohamoud Sheikh Dalmar – journalist and Islamic scholar
Rageh Omaar (b. 1967) – Somali-British author and television news presenter; formerly a BBC news correspondent; in 2009, he moved to a new post at Al Jazeera English, where he currently presents the nightly weekday documentary series Witness
Mohamed Abshir Waldo – political activist and journalist                 
Abdirahman Yabarow – journalist; Editor-in-Chief of the VOA's Somali service.  
Zakaria Madar – Somali multimedia journalist

Judges
 
Abdulqawi Yusuf (b. 1948) –  international lawyer, judge and former President of the International Court of Justice in the Hague.
Adan Haji Ali – judge and current Chief Justice of Somaliland
Khadra Hussein Mohammad – lawyer and first National Deputy Prosecutor in Somaliland
Yusuf Haji Nur – former judge and President of the Supreme Court of the autonomous region of Puntland.

Military
 
Haji Yusuf Barre, commander of the biggest battle in Darawiish history, i.e. Jidbali; was the sole defender of Taleh Dhulbahante garesa
Yusuf Agararan, led most successful Darawiish raid since Dul Madoba
Ibraahin Xoorane, Darawiish commander who killed Richard Corfield
Axmed Aarey, Darawiish artillery commander who abetted Richard Corfield's death
Afqarshe Ismail, former Darawiish spokesman-poet; first person to die in an airstrike in Africa
Nur Hedik, commander of the Dooxato (Darawiish cavalry) who had a Shiikhyaale regiment named after him
General Mohamed Abshir Muse – First General, the commander of Somalia police 1960 1968.
General Nuh Ismail Tani – current Chief of Staff of Somaliland Armed Forces
Abdikarim Yusuf Adam – army officer and Chief of TFG Army
Muktar Hussein Afrah – officer in the army of the Transitional Federal Government
Ahmad ibn Ibrahim al-Ghazi (c. 1507–1543) – 16th-century Imam and military commander; led the Conquest of Abyssinia
Hassan Abdullah Hersi al-Turki (b. 1944) – Islamist leader in Somalia and military leader in the Islamic Courts Union
Mohammed Hussein Ali (b. 1956) – major general in the Kenyan Army and former Commissioner of the Kenya Police
Botan Ise Alin (Bootaan Ciise Caalin) – former faction leader and former member of the Transitional Federal Government
Osman Ali Atto (Cismaan Xasan Cali) (b. 1940) – faction leader affiliated with the Somali National Alliance
Akil Dhahar – leader of the Sanaag region and some portions of the Bari region
Hasna Doreh – early 20th-century Somali female commander of Diiriye Guure
Abdillahi Fadal Iman (1960–2019) – former Commissioner of Somaliland Police Force 
Muhammad Ibrahim Habsade (Maxamed Ibraahim Xaabsade) – rebel soldier
Hussein Hasan famous warrior & poet
Farah Nur warrior and poet
Guled Haji wise sage and commander
Mohammed Abdullah Hassan (1856–1920) Dervish movement during the Scramble for Africa
Ibrahim Boghol  – commander of the Dervish movement
Daud Abdulle Hirsi (1960–1965) – Somali general, considered the father of the Somali Military
Ahmed Madobe – chairman and military commander of Raskamboni movement
Salaad Gabeyre Kediye (d. 1972) – major general in the Somali military; a revolutionary
Mohamed Adan Saqadhi (b. 1967) – current Commissioner of Somaliland Police Force
Mahamoud Mohamed – former Chief of General Staff of the Kenya Defence Forces
Mohamed Afrah Qanyare (Maxamed Qanyare Afrax) (b. 1941) – former faction leader
Abdi Qeybdid (Cabdi Xasan Cawaale Qeybdiid) (b. 1948) – militia leader affiliated with the Somali National Alliance
Muhammad Ali Samatar – former Minister of Defense; first Vice President; Grand Commander of the Somali National Army (1969-1987)
Yusuf Ahmed Sarinle (d. 2005) – general, commander of the Transitional National Government police force
Osman Omar Wehliye – commander of the Somali Police Force from March 2011
Ahmed Abdi Godane – former military leader of Al-Shabaab
Kite Fiqi – warrior and poet

Models
 
Jawahir Ahmed (b. 1991) – Somali-American model; as Miss Somalia, won 2013 Miss Africa Utah and was 2nd runner up in the 2013 Miss United Nations USA pageant
Waris Dirie (b. 1965) – model, author, actress and human rights activist
Halima Aden (b. September 19, 1997) – American fashion model. She is noted for being the first Somali-American to compete and become a semi-finalist in the Miss Minnesota USA pageant. 
Ubah Hassan – Somali-Canadian model
Iman (Iman Mohamed Abdulmajid) (b. 1955) – international fashion icon, supermodel, actress and entrepreneur
Fatima Siad (b. 1986) – third-place finisher on America's Next Top Model, Cycle 10; professional model
Yasmin Warsame (b. 1976) – Somali-Canadian model; in 2004, she was named "The Most Alluring Canadian" in a poll by Fashion magazine

Royals
 
Ahmad ibn Ibrahim al-Ghazi (c. 1506 – February 21, 1543) – Imam and General of the Adal Sultanate who invaded Abyssinia and defeated several Abyssinian emperors. 
Ali ibn Sabr ad-Din (fl. after 1344) – Somali Governor of the Ifat Sultanate
Haqq ad-Din I (fl. 1328) – Somali Emir of the Sultanate of Ifat
Jamal ad-Din I (fl. mid-14th century) – Somali Governor of the Ifat Sultanate
Sabr ad-Din I (fl. 1332) – Somali Emir of the Ifat Sultanate
Haqq ad-Din II (ruled late 14th century) – Somali Sultan of the Ifat Sultanate
Sa'ad ad-Din II (ruled c. 1400) – Somali Sultan of the Ifat Sultanate
Diiriye Guure, head of the Dhulbahante during Dervish era
Ibrahim Adeer – Somali Sultan; founder of the Sultanate of the Geledi
Osman Ahmed – last Sultan of the Geledi Sultanate
Ahmad ibn Ali (fl. mid-14th century) – Somali Governor of the Ifat Sultanate
Arrawelo – Somali Queen of 300 B.C.
Gerad Ali Dable (d. 1503) – 12th Sultan of the Warsangali Sultanate
Guled Abdi – 1st Grand sultan of the Isaaq 
Farah Guled – 2nd Grand Sultan of the Isaaq 
Gerad Dhidhin (d. 1311) – founder of the Warsangali Sultanate
Olol Diinle – last Sultan of the Neo-Ajuran Sultanate
Deria Sugulleh Ainashe – 2nd Sultan of the Habr Yunis
Awad Deria – 5th Sultan of the Habr Yunis
Mahamud Ibrahim – second Sultan of the Sultanate of the Geledi
Yusuf Mahamud Ibrahim – third Sultan of the Geledi Sultanate and victor of the Bardera wars
Ali Yusuf Kenadid – second Sultan of the Sultanate of Hobyo
Hassan Farah – 3rd Grand Sultan of the Isaaq
Yusuf Ali Kenadid – Somali ruler, and the founder of the Sultanate of Hobyo in the 1880s
Osman Mahamuud – King of the Majeerteen Sultanate in the mid-19th to early 20th centuries
Mahfuz – Emir of Harar and Governor of Zeila in the Adal Sultanate
Abdillahi Deria – 5th Grand Sultan of the Isaaq
Abdulrahman Deria – Sultan of the Habr Awal
Nur ibn Mujahid (d. 1567) – 16th-century Somali Emir and patron saint of Harar
Faduma Sarjelle – Somali princess of the House of Garen
Mohamoud Ali Shire (d. 1960) – 26th Sultan of the Warsangali Sultanate from 1897 to 1960
Hersi Aman – legendary 3rd Sultan of the Habr Yunis
Ahmed Yusuf (d. 1878) – fourth Sultan of the Gobroon Dynasty well versed in Islam and dominant in the Banadir
Nur Ahmed Aman (d. 1908) – 4th Habr Yunis Sultan & major Dervish leader
Deria Hassan – 4th Sultan of the Isaaq clan

Pilots
 
Asli Hassan Abade – first Somali female pilot; prominent member of the Somali Air Force; paved the way for gender equality within the military ranks
Ali Matan Hashi – first Somali pilot and prominent member of SRC
Mustafa Mohamed Moalim (Mustafa Maxamed Macalin) (1943–2009) – first Somali fighter pilot; chief of the Somali Air Force School; chief of the Somali Air Force Operations
Muse Bihi Abdi – Somali air pilot
Khalif Isse Mudan – Balidoogle military base pilot

Politicians

Presidents of Somalia 
  
 Abdiqasim Salad (Cabdiqaasim Salaad Xasan) (b. 1941) – former President of Somalia
 Ali Mahdi Muhammad (1938–2021) – fourth President of Somalia
 Abdirashid Shermarke (1919–1969) – second President of Somalia
 Aden Daar (1908–2007) – Somali politician and the country's first president
 Siad Barre (1919–1995) – third President of Somalia
Abdullahi Yusuf Ahmed (1934–2012) – former President of Somalia, first President of Puntland, founder of the Somali Salvation Democratic Front, the Puntland State of Somalia, and the Transitional Federal Government
 Muse Hassan Sheikh Sayid Abdulle (b. 1940) – former acting President of Somalia and former Speaker of the Federal Parliament of Somalia; former General in the Somali National Army
 Sharif Sheikh Ahmed (b. 1964) – former President of Somalia and former Chairman of the Alliance for the Re-liberation of Somalia Alliance for the Re-liberation of Somalia. He was also Commander in Chief of the Islamic Courts Union.

Presidents of Puntland 
  
 Abdullahi Yusuf Ahmed (1934–2012) — former President of Somalia, first President of Puntland, founder of the Somali Salvation Democratic Front, the Puntland State of Somalia, and the Transitional Federal Government
 Yusuf Haji Nur (Yuusuf Xaaji Nuur) — former acting President of Puntland
 Jama Ali Jama — former President of Puntland
 Mohamed Abdi Hashi (d. July 12, 2020) — first Vice President of Puntland (1998-2004) and Second President of Puntland ~interim (2004-2005)
 Mohamud Muse Hersi Cadde (d. August 1, 2020) — Third President of Puntland (2005-2009)
 Abdirahman Farole (b. 1945) — Fourth President of Puntland (2009-2014)
 Abdiweli Mohamed Ali Gaas (b. 1963)— Fifth President of Puntland (2014-2019)
 Said Abdullahi Deni (b. 1965) — Sixth and current President of Puntland (2019)
 Hassan Dahir Afqurac (d. 2013) Third Vice President of Puntland (2005 –2009)
 Abdisamad Ali Shire (d. 2021) Fourth Vice President of Puntland (2009-2014)
 Abdihakim Abdullahi Haji Omar Amey - Fifth Vice President of Puntland (2014-2019)
 Ahmed Elmi Osman Karaash - Sixth and Current Vice President of Puntland (2019)

Presidents of Somaliland 
  
 Abdirahman Ahmed Ali Tuur (1931–2003) – first President of Somaliland 1991-1993
 Abdirahman Aw Ali Farrah – third Vice President of Somaliland 1995-1997
 Dahir Riyale Kahin (b. 1952) – third President of Somaliland 2002-2010
 Ahmed Mohamed Mohamoud (b. 1936) – fourth President of Somaliland 2010-2017
 Muse Bihi Abdi (b. 1948) – fifth and current President of Somaliland 2017-?

Presidents of D.Jibouti 
  
 Hassan Gouled Aptidon (1916–2006) – first President of Djibouti, 1977-1999
 Ismaïl Omar Guelleh (b. 1947) – second and current President of Djibouti

Acting Presidents 

Mohamed Jawari – acting President of Somalia and incumbent Speaker of the Federal Parliament of Somalia
Aden Madobe – former acting President of Somalia
Michael Mariano (d. 1987) – Somali Youth League member, Ambassador, and notable advocate for occupied Somalis in Ethiopia

Prime ministers
 
Cabbaas Xuseen, first prime minister of the Darawiish (1895 - 1900)
Abdirashid Shermarke – first Prime Minister of Somalia after independence ~1960
Xaashi Suni Fooyaan - peace-time prime minister of the Darawiish (1905-1906)
Abdiweli Sheikh Ahmed – former Prime Minister of Somalia
Abdiweli Gaas – former Prime Minister of Somalia
Osman Jama Ali (Cismaan Jaamac Cali) (b. 1941) – Prime Minister under the Transitional National Government
Muse Bihi Abdi – (b. 1948) Former military officer; Chairman of the Peace, Unity, and Development Party and current President of Somaliland
Muhammad Haji Ibrahim Egal (Maxamed Xaaji Ibraahim Cigaal) (1993–2002) – President of Somaliland and former Prime Minister of Somalia
Hassan Abshir Farah (Xasan Abshir Faarax) (b. 1945) – former Prime Minister of Somalia, former Mayor of Mogadishu, and MP
Ali Khalif Galaydh (Cali Khalif Galaydh) (1941–2020) – former Prime Minister of Somalia under the Transitional National Government
Umar Arteh Ghalib (Cumar Carte Qaalib) (1922–2020) – former Prime Minister of Somalia
Ali Ghedi (Cali Maxamed Geedi) (b. 1951) – former Prime Minister of the Transitional Federal Government (TFG)
Abdiwahid Gonjeh – former Acting Prime Minister of Somalia
Abdi Farah Shirdon - former Prime Minister of Somalia
Abdirizak Haji Hussein (Cabdirasaaq Xaaji Xuseen) (1924–2014) – Prime Minister of Somalia early in the 1960s
Nur Hassan Hussein (Nuur Xasan Xuseen "Nuur Cade") (1938–2020) – former Prime Minister of the TFG
Abdullahi Issa (1922–1988) (Cabdullahi Ciise Maxamuud) – first Prime Minister of Somalia
Muhammad Abdi Yusuf former Prime Minister of Somalia
Hassan Ali Khaire (b. 1968) – former  Prime Minister of Somalia
Mohamed Abdullahi Mohamed ("Farmajo") (b. 1962) – former Prime Minister of Somalia and current President
Omar Sharmarke (b. 1960) – former Prime Minister of Somalia
Mohamed Hussein Roble former Prime Minister of Somalia
Hamza Abdi Barre – current Prime Minister of Somalia

Other politicians
 
 
Asha Ahmed Abdalla – Somali parliamentarian and activist
Yusuf Hassan Abdi (b. 1958) – senior Somali diplomat; Member of Kenya Parliament
Zahra Abdulla (b. 1966) – Somali politician in Finland; a member of the Helsinki City Council, representing the Green League
Abdirahman Mohamed Abdullahi – former speaker of House of Representatives of Somaliland and founder of Waddani Party
Fowziya Yusuf Haji Adan – former Foreign Minister of Somalia
Abdullahi Ahmed Addow (Cabdilaahi Axmed Caddoow) (b. 1936) – senior Somali politician and diplomat
Ali Mohamed Ahmed – Head of Somali Business union and former Somali Customs Manager; Former Adviser of Somali President Sharif Sheikh Ahmed
Mohamed Kahin Ahmed – current Minister of Interior of Somaliland
Abdurrahman Mahmoud Aidiid – current Mayor of Hargesia
Mohamed Farrah Aidid (Maxamed Faarax Caydiid) (1934–1996) – chairman of the United Somali Congress and later the Somali National Alliance
Fatuma Ibrahim Ali – Somali legislator; MP in National Assembly of Kenya
Abdihakim Amey – Vice President of Puntland
Abukar Arman – Somali writer and diplomat; former Special Envoy of Somalia to the United States
Hassan Dahir Aweys (Xasan Daahir Aweys) (b. 1935) – head of the 90-member Shura council of the Islamic Courts Union
Abdirahman Jama Barre – former Foreign Minister of Somalia and close relative of Siad Barre; longest-serving Somali diplomat
Haji Bashir – first President of the Somali National Assembly; former Minister of Health and Labour of Somalia
Fatimo Isaak Bihi – ambassador to Geneva and former Director of the African Department of the Ministry of Foreign Affairs
Ali Dhere – cleric; head of the first Islamic Courts Union in Mogadishu in 1996; spokesman for Al-Shabaab
Hussein Ali Duale (Xuseen Cali Ducaale) – former Finance Minister of Somaliland, and former ambassador of Somalia to Kenya and Uganda
Hussein Abdi Dualeh – former Minister of Energy & Minerals of Somaliland
Adan Ahmed Elmi – former Minister of Agriculture of Somaliland
Bashe Mohamed Farah – speaker of the House of Representatives of Somaliland
Adde Gabow (Mohamed Ali Hassan or Maxamed Cali Xasan) – former governor of the Banaadir region and mayor of Mogadishu
Suleiman Haglotosiye – former Minister of Health of Somaliland
Anisa Hajimumin – Somali-American politician, social activist and writer; Minister of Women & Family Affairs of Puntland
Bur'i Mohamed Hamza – State Minister of Foreign Affairs of Somalia
Abdulkadir Abdi Hashi – politician; MP and former Minister of State for Planning and International Cooperation of Puntland
Abdishakur Mohamoud Hassan – current Mayor of Berbera
Ahmed M. Hassan – Somali American member-elect of the Clarkston City Council 
Hassan Abdallah Hassan – current Mayor of Bosaso
Mohamed Moallim Hassan, politician who served as minister of fishery and marine resources of Somalia, 2010-2011
Mark Hendrick (b. 1958) – Somali-British politician and Labour Co-operative Member of Parliament
Mohamud Siraji Member of Somali Parliament
Abdirashid Mohamed Hidig (Cabdirashiid Maxamed Xidig) – Member of Parliament in the Transitional Federal Parliament
Sheikh Mukhtar Mohamed Hussein (Sheekh Mukhtaar Maxamed Xuseen) (b. 1912) – speaker of parliament and interim president
Zakia Hussein – politician; Secretary General of the Hanoolaato Party
Halima Ismail Ibrahim – Chair of Somalia's National Independent Electoral Commission 
Mohamed Mohamud Ibrahim (b. 1946/47) – Deputy Prime Minister and Minister of Foreign Affairs of Somalia
Jaylaani Nur Ikar – first Deputy Speaker of the Federal Parliament of Somalia
Yusuf Mohammed Siad Inda'ade (Yuusuf Maxamed Siyaad "Indhacadde") – member of the Islamic Courts Union
Abdullahi Sheikh Ismail (Cabdullaahi Sheekh Ismaaciil) – deputy Prime Minister and Foreign Minister in the TFG
Edna Adan Ismail (Edna Aadan Ismaaciil) (b. 1937) – former Foreign Minister of Somaliland
Ismail Ali Ismail – writer and former diplomat
Bashir Isse – Governor of the Central Bank of Somalia
Ali Ibrahim Jama – current Governor of the Central Bank of Somaliland
Ahmed Sheikh Jama – academician, writer, poet and politician; former Minister of Information of Puntland
Farah Ali Jama – politician; former Minister of Finance of Puntland
Hibaq Jama – Somali-British politician; Ward Councillor for Lawrence Hill
Abdirizak Jurile – Vice Minister of Foreign Affairs (1989-1991); Minister of Planning and International cooperation (2005-2008); Minister of telecommunications (2009-2011); Member of the Upper House of the Federal Government of Somalia; Senator (2016)
Maryam Kassim – Minister of Social Development of Somalia
Mohamed Kiimiko – politician and diplomat
Farah Maalim – current deputy speaker of the Kenyan parliament
Mahboub Maalim – diplomat; Executive Secretary of the Intergovernmental Authority on Development
Hassan Ali Mire – politician; first Minister of Education of the Somali Democratic Republic
Abdinur Sheikh Mohamed – Somali-American educator and politician; former Minister of Education, Higher Education and Culture of Somalia
Ali Omar Mohamed – former Manager of Berbera Port
Amina Mohamed – former Chairman of the International Organization for Migration and the World Trade Organisation's General Council, and current Secretary for Foreign Affairs of Kenya
Hussein Maalim Mohamed – former Kenyan Minister of State in the office of the president
Hassan Haji Mohamoud – former Minister of Education of Somaliland
Yasin Haji Mohamoud – current Foreign Minister of Somaliland
Mohamed Hassan Maidane – current Mayor of Borama
Mohammed Said Hersi Morgan (Maxamed Siciid Xirsi Moorgan) – son-in-law of Siad Barre and Minister of Defense of Somalia
Ismail Qasim Naji (Ismaaciil Qaasim Naaji) – chief of staff of the Transitional Federal Government
Ahmed Abdi Ogle (1937–2006) – first Somali to serve in the Kenyan Parliament in the 60s; three times elected and served as Assistant Minister and later Deputy Mayor of Nairobi
Daud Mohamed Omar – Minister of Mineral Resources of Somalia
Mohamed Abdullahi Omaar – former Foreign Minister of Somalia
Mohammad Abdullahi Omar – politician; former Foreign Minister of Somaliland
Daud Mohamed Omar – Minister of Mineral Resources of Somalia
Ilhan Omar - U.S. Representative from Minnesota's 5th congressional district
Mohamed Amin Osman – member of the Transitional Federal Parliament
Sheikhnor Abikar Qassim – founder of one of the Southern Somali Union
Saynab Qayad - member of the Transitional federal parliament of Somalia
Ali Said Raygal – former Minister of Youth and Sports of Somaliland
Yusuf Warsame Saeed – former Mayor of Hargeisa
Abdirahman Saylici – current Vice President of Somaliland
Mohamed Aden Sheikh (c. 1925–2010) – intellectual, former head of Somali Technological Development, former Minister of Education, and former Minister of Health
Dr. Saad Ali Shire – current Finance Minister of Somaliland
Abbas Abdullahi Sheikh Siraji  (1985-2017) Minister of Public Works and Reconstruction 
Faysal Ali Warabe – engineer and politician; founder and Chairman of (UCID political party
Abdi Warsame – Somali American member-elect of the Minneapolis City Council
Saado Ali Warsame – singer-songwriter and politician; former MP in the Federal Parliament of Somalia
Adan Keynan Wehliye – Kenyan politician and a long time member of parliament from Wajir
Ahmed Yusuf Yasin (b. 1957) – former Vice President of Somaliland
Mohamed Bihi Yonis (b. 1947) – Deputy Joint United Nations African Union Special Representative for Darfur and former Foreign Minister of Somaliland
Maryan Abdullahi Yusuf – banker; Deputy Governor of the Central Bank of Somalia
Ahmed Abdallah Wayel – former Minister of Education (2012)
Aden Ibrahim Aw Hirsi (b. 1968) – Somali politician, Sufi, author, educator and poet; the governor of Gedo region, 2006–2009

Scientists
 
Osman Aden Abdulle – geneticist; has studied the Somali blood type and its ethnogenesis; in 1987 he jointly discovered with his colleagues a new Rh gene complex producing the rare Cx (Rh9) antigen in the Somali population
Abdusalam Abubakar (b. 1989/90) – one of the youngest winners of the BT Young Scientist of the Year Award; later went on to win the European Union Contest for Young Scientists for his project,  An Extension of Wiener's Attack on RSA
Hassan al-Jabarti (d. 1774) –  mathematician, theologian, astronomer and philosopher, considered one of the great scholars of the 18th century
Amina Said Ali – author, poet, and medical scientist based in Stockholm, Sweden
Ali Said Faqi – scientist and the leading researcher on the design and interpretation of toxicology studies at the MPI research center in Mattawan, Michigan
Jama Musse Jama (b. 1967) – ethnomathematician and author; known for his research on traditional Somali board games such as Shax and the history of mathematics in the Horn of Africa and the founder of Hargeisa Cultural Center
Ahmed Mumin Warfa – scientist, specialised in botany and jointly discovered the Cyclamen somalense, the first genus from tropical Africa with his colleague Mats Thulin; the "world's pre-eminent authority on frankincense"; professor at Salt Lake Community College

Muslim Theologians
 
Ishaaq bin Ahmed – 12th century cleric and forefather of the large Isaaq clan-family
Abd al Aziz al-Amawi (1832–1896) – 19th-century diplomat, historian, poet, jurist and scholar living in the Sultanate of Zanzibar
Uways al-Barawi (1847–1909) – scholar credited with reviving Islam in 19th-century East Africa and with followers in Yemen and Indonesia
Sheikh Madar (1825-1918) – Qadiriyya leader who was influential in the expansion of Hargeisa
Abd al-Rahman al-Jabarti (1753–1825) – scholar living in Cairo; recorded the Napoleonic invasion of Egypt
Abdirahman bin Isma'il al-Jabarti (fl. 10th-11th centuries) – early Muslim leader and forefather of the Darod clan
Ali al-Jabarti (d. 1492) – 15th-century scholar and politician in the Mamluk Empire
Yusuf bin Ahmad al-Kawneyn – 13th-century scholar and saint; associated with the development of Wadaad's writing
Abdallah al-Qutbi (1879–1952) – polemicist theologian and philosopher; best known for his Al-Majmu'at al-mubaraka ("The Blessed Collection"), a five-part compilation of polemics
Abd Al-Rahman bin Ahmad al-Zayla'i (1820–1882) – scholar; played a crucial role in the spread of the Qadiriyya movement in Somalia and East Africa
Abadir Umar Ar-Rida – 13th-century cleric and saint of Harar; forefather of the Sheekhaal Somali clan
Sa'id of Mogadishu – 14th-century scholar and traveler; his reputation as a scholar earned him audiences with the Emirs of Mecca and Medina; travelled across the Muslim world and visited Bengal and China
Shaykh Sufi – born Abdul-Rahman bin Abdallah al Shashi (Arabic: عبد الرحمن بن عبد الله شاشي) (1829–1904), 19th-century scholar, poet, reformist and astrologist
Uthman bin Ali Zayla'i (d. 1342) – 14th-century  theologian and jurist who wrote the single most authoritative text on the Hanafi school of Islam, four volumes known as the Tabayin al-Haqa'iq li Sharh Kanz al-Daqa'iq
Hussain Bisad – tallest Somali man alive; has the largest hand span in the world
Haji Ali Majeerteen – popularly known as al-Majeerteen; was a Somali Sheikh and poet

See also

Somali people
Music of Somalia
Music of Djibouti
Somali Culture

References

Lists of people by ethnicity

Djibouti-related lists